Ferdinand Karl Franz Schwarzmann, Ritter von Hebra (7 September 1816, in Brno, Moravia – 5 August 1880 in Vienna, Austria-Hungary) was an Austrian physician and dermatologist known as the founder of the New Vienna School of Dermatology, an important group of physicians who established the foundations of modern dermatology.

Life

Ferdinand Schwarzmann von Hebra was born to a military officer. He first studied in Graz, then entered the University of Vienna and graduated in medicine in 1841. He was influenced by Carl Freiherr von Rokitansky, one of the founders of modern pathological anatomy.

While still a young man, Hebra wrote one of the most influential books on dermatology of all times, the Atlas der Hautkrankeiten (Atlas of skin diseases), with phenomenal illustrations by two of the leading medical illustrators of Austria, Anton Elfinger (1821–1864) and Carl Heitzmann (1836–1896).

Thought not its original discoverer, von Hebra's 1844 treatise on scabies dispelled any remaining doubt that the itch mite was the cause of scabies. This publication was the inflection point where the term 'scabies' transitioned from referring to a collection of non-specific itchy ailments, to a particular pathological process specifically caused by the itch mite (albeit with many manifestations).

In the second half of the 19th century, Hebra introduced resurfacing and restoring skin with chemical peel. He used exfoliative agents, like phenol, croton oil, nitric acid in various cautious combination for treating freckles and skin irregularities. He greatly influenced Carl Mayrhofer, who continued Semmelweis's research on puerperal fever.

Semmelweis and Hebra

An early supporter of Ignaz Semmelweis and the editor of a leading Austrian medical journal, Hebra announced Semmelweis's discovery that handwashing with chloride of lime reduces the incidence of puerperal fever in the December 1847 and April 1848 issues of the Viennese medical journal. Hebra claimed that Semmelweis's work had a practical significance comparable to that of Edward Jenner's introduction of cowpox inoculations to prevent smallpox.

Hebra was the only friend who kept in touch with Semmelweis after his departure from Vienna.

Due to Semmelweis's suffering from severe depression and other mental problems, János Balassa signed a document which committed him to a mental institution. On 30 July 1865 Hebra was one of the party who arranged Semmelweis’s fake trip to his “new water-cure hospital”, actually taking the long-time friend into a Viennese asylum for the insane located in the Lazarettgasse (Landes-Irren-Anstalt in der Lazarettgasse). On arrival there, Semmelweis guessed what was happening and tried to leave, but he was forcibly subdued by the asylum's guards and died two weeks later from a gangrenous wound which may have been caused by the struggle.

Notes

References

Sources

External links
 Ferdinand von Hebra. WhoNamedIt
 Hebra Atlas. DermIS site in German, with many illustrations from the famous book and a biography of von Hebra.

1816 births
1880 deaths
People from Brno in health professions
People from the Margraviate of Moravia
Austrian people of Moravian-German descent
Austrian knights
Austrian dermatologists
Academic staff of the University of Vienna